Sur Chah-e Bala (also Romanized as Sūr Chāh-e Bālā; also known as Sūr Chāh) is a village in Surak Rural District, Lirdaf District, Jask County, Hormozgan Province, Iran. At the 2006 census, its population was 185, in 39 families.

References 

Populated places in Jask County